Last Words of the Emperor Marcus Aurelius is an 1844 painting by the French artist Eugène Delacroix, now in the Museum of Fine Arts of Lyon. A preliminary sketch of the painting that was given to Delacroix's student Louis de Planet is also kept in the museum.

Description and analysis
This large painting depicts the last hours of the life of Roman Emperor Marcus Aurelius, as Delacroix admired the Stoics and particularly Marcus Aurelius. The character is represented in the center of the painting as an old, sick man who grabs the arm of a young man dressed in red, namely his son Commodus (Lucius Aurelius Commodus Antoninus). Commodus seems not to pay attention to what his father wants to say and has a haughty look. Around them, Marcus Aurelius' philosopher friends who are present around the bed are portrayed as sad men dressed in black.

Thus, the painting represents the end of the Roman Empire. Delacroix, who was fascinated by the red color after his travel to North Africa in 1832, draws the viewer's attention to  Commodus by garbing him in bright red. It appears that the painting has no moral aspect, as the message that Delacroix wanted to convey in this work remains unknown.

Reception
The first text which speaks of the painting is the catalog of the Salon of 1845 where it was exposed, which reads: "The figure of Marcus Aurelius, indeed sick and almost dying, seems to us in a too early decomposing state; the shades of green and yellow which hammer his face give him a quite cadaverous appearance", "some draperies may be too crumpled" and "some attitudes show a lack of nobility". The work received mostly negative reviews, but the writer Charles Baudelaire appreciated it and said: "A beautiful, huge, sublime, misunderstood picture [...]. The color [...], far from losing its cruel originality in this new and more complete scene, is still bloody and terrible".

References

1844 paintings
Paintings by Eugène Delacroix
Paintings in the collection of the Museum of Fine Arts of Lyon
Cultural depictions of Marcus Aurelius
Paintings about death